Eight ships of the Royal Navy have borne the name HMS Satellite:

  was a 16-gun brig-sloop launched in 1806. She foundered in 1810.
  was an 18-gun  launched in 1812 and sold in 1824.
  was an 18-gun sloop launched in 1826 and broken up in 1849.
  was a paddle gunboat launched in 1840 and listed until 1860.
  was a wooden  screw corvette launched in 1855 and broken up in 1879.
  was a  composite screw corvette launched in 1881. She was used as a drill ship for the Royal Naval Reserve from 1904 and was sold in 1947.
She was renamed HMS Satellite on becoming a drill ship in 1947. The name reverted to Melita in 1951, and she was sold for scrapping in 1959.
She was renamed HMS Satellite on becoming a drill ship in 1951, and was sold in 1958.

Royal Navy ship names